JH may refer to:

 Jh (digraph), in written language
 JH (hash function), in cryptography
 Japan Highway Public Corporation
 Jharkhand, India (ISO 3166: JH)
 Juvenile hormone
 Fuji Dream Airlines (since 2008, IATA code JH), a Japanese airline
 Harlequin Air (1997-2005, IATA code JH), a former Japanese airline
 Nordeste Linhas Aéreas Regionais (1976-1995, IATA code JH), a former Brazilian airline